Athletics competitions at the 1973 Bolivarian Games were held at the Estadio Revolución in Panama City, Panama, between February 17 - March 3, 1973.  

A detailed history of the early editions of the Bolivarian Games between 1938
and 1989 was published in a book written (in Spanish) by José Gamarra
Zorrilla, former president of the Bolivian Olympic Committee, and first
president (1976-1982) of ODESUR.  Gold medal winners from Ecuador were published by the Comité Olímpico Ecuatoriano.

A total of 34 events were contested, 22 by men and 12 by women.

Medal summary

Medal winners were published.

Men

Women

Medal table (unofficial)

References

Athletics at the Bolivarian Games
Bolivarian Games
1973 in Panama
International athletics competitions hosted by Panama